Rhododendron liliiflorum (百合花杜鹃) is a rhododendron species native to Guangxi, Guizhou, Hunan, and southeast Yunnan, China, where it grows at altitudes of . The flowers are predominantly white.

References
 "Rhododendron liliiflorum", H. Léveillé, Repert. Spec. Nov. Regni Veg. 12: 102. 1913.
 The Plant List
 Flora of China
 Hirsutum.com

liliiflorum